Sansad or Sangsad is the word for "Assembly", association, council or "Parliament" in several Indo-Aryan languages, derived from a Sanskrit root. It may also mean:

National parliament

Bangladesh
 Jatiya Sangsad ("National Parliament" of Bangladesh; Bengali: জাতীয় সংসদ Jatiyô Sôngsôd)
Jatiya Sangsad Bhaban, National Parliament House of Bangladesh
 Speaker of the Jatiya Sangsad
 Sangsad Television

India
 Bhāratīya Sansad (Parliament of India)
Sansad Marg
 Sansad Bhavan
 Sansad TV
 Sansad Adarsh Gram Yojana

Nepal
 Saṅghīya Sansad Nēpāl (Nepali: संघीय संसद नेपाल) Federal Parliament of Nepal

Other uses
 Muktijoddha Sangsad, a non-political welfare association of the combatants during the Bangladesh Liberation war
 Padatik Nattya Sangsad, a Dhaka based Bengali theatre group
 Muktijoddha Sangsad KC, a football club in Bangladesh
 Kendriya Muslim Sahitya Sangsad, a literary organisation located in Sylhet, Bangladesh
 Narayanganj Suktara Sangsad, a football team of Narayanganj, Bangladesh
 Pakistan Sahitya Sangsad

See also